Stabben Lighthouse is a coastal lighthouse located in Kinn municipality in Vestland county, Norway.

History
It was established in 1867, renovated and upgraded in 1905, and automated in 1975. It was listed as a protected site in 1999.

The 4th order Fresnel lens (installed in 1905) remains in use. At the top of the tower, there is a white, red, or green light (depending on direction) that is occulting three times every 10 seconds.

See also
Lighthouses in Norway
List of lighthouses in Norway

References

External links

 Norsk Fyrhistorisk Forening 

Lighthouses completed in 1867
Lighthouses in Vestland
Listed lighthouses in Norway
Kinn